Chicago Public Schools (CPS) is a large public school district consisting of primary and secondary schools within the city limits of Chicago, in the U.S. state of Illinois.

Schools

High schools

There are several types of high schools in the district, including neighborhood, career academy, charter, contract, magnet, military academy, selective enrollment, small and special education.

Alternative Learning Options (ALOP)
Bridgescape Schools
Bridgescape Academy Brainerd
Bridgescape Academy Humboldt Park
Bridgescape Academy Lawndale
Bridgescape Academy Roseland

Career and Technical Education (CTE)
Louisa May Alcott College Preparatory High School
Ace Amandla Charter High School
Amundsen High School* 
Austin Community Academy High School*
Bogan High School*
Bowen High School*
Chicago Vocational Career Academy*
Roberto Clemente Community Academy*
Collins Academy High School
Curie Metropolitan High School*
Dunbar Vocational Career Academy
Dyett High School*
Farragut Career Academy*
Fenger Academy High School*
Foreman High School*
Gage Park High School*
Hancock High School
Harlan Community Academy High School*
Harper High School*
Hirsch Metropolitan High School*
Hyde Park Academy High School*
Jones College Prep High School
Benito Juarez Community Academy*
Julian High School* 
Thomas Kelly High School* 
Manley Career Academy High School*
John Marshall Metropolitan High School*
Mather High School*
North Grand High School*
Wendell Phillips Academy High School*
Prosser Career Academy
Al Raby High School
Richards Career Academy*
Roosevelt High School*
Carl Schurz High School*
Simeon Career Academy
Solorio Academy High School*
South Shore International College Preparatory High School
Roger C. Sullivan High School*
Uplift Community High School
George Washington High School
Wells Community Academy High School
George Westinghouse College Prep
Daniel Hale Williams Preparatory School of Medicine
Little Black Pearl Art and Design Academy

Charter
Acero Charter Schools
Major Hector P. Garcia MD
Victoria Soto
ASPIRA Charter Schools
ASPIRA Business and Finance
ASPIRA Early College High School
Chicago Collegiate Charter School
Chicago Math and Science Academy
Chicago International Charter School (CICS)
CICS ChicagoQuest North
CICS Ralph Ellison
CICS Longwood 
CICS Northtown Academy
EPIC Academy Charter High School
Foundations College Preparatory Charter School
Institutio
Instituto Health Sciences Career Academy 
Instituto - Justice Lozano
Intrinsic Charter School
Noble Network of Charter Schools
Baker
Butler
Chicago Bulls
Gary Comer
DRW
Golder 
Hansberry
ITW Speer
Johnson 
Mansueto
Muchin 
Noble Academy
Noble Street 
Pritzker 
Rauner 
Rowe-Clark 
UIC
Perspectives Charter Schools
Urban Prep Academies
Youth Connection Charter School
Latino Youth High School
West Town Academy
Young Women's Leadership Charter School of Chicago

Citywide-Option
Sarah E. Goode STEM Academy
Nancy B. Jefferson Alternative High School
Simpson Academy High School for Young Women
Consuella B. York Alternative High School

Contract
Chicago Excel Academy (Camelot charter)
Chicago High School for the Arts
Chicago Technology Academy
Little Black Pearl Art and Design Academy

International Baccalaureate (IB)
Amundsen High School
Back of the Yards College Preparatory High School
Benito Juarez Community Academy
Bogan High School
Bronzeville Scholastic Institute
Carl Schurz High School 
Curie Metropolitan High School
Farragut Career Academy
George Washington High School
Hubbard High School
Hyde Park Academy High School
Kennedy High School
Lincoln Park High School 
Morgan Park High School
Ogden International High School
Prosser Career Academy
Roberto Clemente Community Academy
Senn High School
South Shore International College Preparatory High School
Steinmetz College Prep 
Thomas Kelly High School 
Taft High School

Magnet
Chicago High School for Agricultural Sciences
Michele Clark Magnet High School
Crane Medical Preparatory High School
Curie Metropolitan High School
DeVry University Advantage Academy - Grades 11-12, with college credit
Disney II Magnet High School
Harlan Community Academy High School (Engineering Program)
Senn High School (Fine and Performing Arts Program)
Von Steuben Metropolitan Science Center

Military academies

Air Force Academy High School
Carver Military Academy
Chicago Military Academy
Marine Leadership Academy at Ames
Phoenix Military Academy
Rickover Naval Academy

Neighborhood
Amundsen High School*
Austin Community Academy High School*
Bogan High School*
Bowen High School*
Chatham Academy High School (no attendance boundaries)
Corliss High School*
Douglass Academy High School (no attendance boundaries)
Dyett High School*
Englewood Stem High School
Gage Park High School*
Harlan Community Academy High School*
Hirsch Metropolitan High School*
Infinity Math Science & Technology High School*
John Hope College Preparatory High School (no attendance boundaries)
Hubbard High School*
Kelvyn Park High School*
Kennedy High School*
Kenwood Academy*
Lake View High School*
Lincoln Park High School*
Morgan Park High School*
North Grand High School*
Orr Academy High School*
Senn High School*
Solorio Academy High School*
Tilden High School*
George Washington High School*

Selective enrollment
 George Westinghouse College Prep
 Gwendolyn Brooks College Preparatory Academy
 John Hancock College Preparatory High School
 Jones College Prep High School
 King College Prep
 Lane Technical College Prep High School
 Northside College Preparatory High School
 Robert Lindblom Math & Science Academy
 South Shore International College Preparatory High School
 Walter Payton College Prep
 Whitney M. Young Magnet High School

Small
Louisa May Alcott College Preparatory High School
Austin Community Academy High School
Bowen High School
Bronzeville Scholastic Institute
Chicago Academy High School
Collins Academy High School
Al Raby High School
TEAM Englewood Community Academy

Special education
 Northside Learning Center High School
 Ray Graham Training Center
 Southside Occupational High School
Vaughn Occupational High School

Elementary/middle schools

Zoned Middle Schools
Albany Park Multicultural Academy
Evergreen Academy Middle School
Eugene Field Elementary School
Irene C. Hernandez Middle School for the Advancement of Science
Francisco I. Madero Middle School
Northwest Middle School
Robert J. Richardson Middle School
James Shields Middle School
Wendell E Green Elementary School

Zoned 3-8
Joseph E. Gary School website

Zoned K-8

Zoned K-8 A
Jane Addams School website
Louis A. Agassiz School website
Louisa May Alcott School website
Ira F. Aldridge School website
Ariel (formerly Shakespeare) School website
Phillip D. Armour School website
George Armstrong School website
Ashburn School website
Arthur R. Ashe School website
John J. Audubon School website
Avalon Park School website
Mariano Azuela School website

Zoned K-8 B
Alice L. Barnard School website
Clara Barton School website
Perkins Bass School website
Newton Bateman School website
Jean Baptiste Beaubien School website
Ludwig Van Beethoven School website
Jacob Beidler School website
Hiram H. Belding School website
Alexander Graham Bell School website
Belmont-Cragin School website
Frank I. Bennett School website
James G. Blaine School website
Carrie Jacobs Bond School website
Daniel Boone School website
Edward A. Bouchet (formerly Bryn Mawr) School website
Myra Bradwell School website
Joseph Brennemann School website
Lorenz Brentano School website
Norman A. Bridge School website
Orville T. Bright School website
Brighton Park School website
Ronald Brown (formerly Samuel Gompers) School website
William H. Brown School website
Milton Brunson School website
Lyman A. Budlong School website
Luther Burbank School website
Edmond Burke School website
Augustus H. Burley School website
Burnham (formerly Luella) School website
Jonathan Burr School website
John C. Burroughs School website
Michael M. Byrne School website

Zoned K-8 C
Charles P. Caldwell School website
Calmeca School website
Daniel R. Cameron School website
Marvin Camras School website
Arthur E. Canty School website
Lazaro Cardenas School website
Andrew Carnegie School website
Carroll/Rosenwald Specialty School School website
Rachel Carson (formerly Gage Park) School website
William W. Carter School website
George Washington Carver School website
Pablo Casals School website
George F. Cassell School website
Willa Cather School website
Thomas Chalmers School website
Eliza Chappell School website
Salmon P. Chase School website
Cesar E. Chavez School website
Frederic Chopin School website
Walter S. Christopher School website
George Rogers Clark School website
Henry Clay School website
Grover Cleveland School website
DeWitt Clinton School website
Henry R. Clissold School website
Johnie Colemon School website
Edward Coles School website
Columbia Explorers Academy School website
Christopher Columbus School website
John W. Cook School website
John C. Coonley School website
Peter Cooper School website
Daniel J. Corkery School website
Mary E. Courtenay (formerly Stockton) School website
Crown School website
Paul Cuffe School website
Countee Cullen School website
George W. Curtis School website

Zoned K-8 D

Ricard J. Daley School website
Charles R. Darwin School website
Nathan S. Davis School website
Arthur Dixon Elementary School
Everett McKinley Dirksen School website
John C. Dore Elementary School School website

Zoned K-8 E
Christian Ebinger, Sr. School website
John F. Eberhart School website

Zoned K-8 G
Frank L. Gillespie School website
Goethe School website
Virgil Grissom School website

Zoned K-8 H
Charles G. Hammond School website
Helen M. Hefferan School website
John Hay School website
Lionel Hampton Fine & Performing Arts School
Robert Healy School website

Zoned K-8 J
Jenner

Zoned K-8 L

Abraham Lincoln School website
Carl von Linné School website

Zoned K-8 M
Arnold Mireles School website
George Manierre School website
Oscar Mayer School website
Donald L. Morrill

Zoned K-8 N
Louis Nettelhorst School website
Walter L Newberry Math & Science Academy School website
Florence Nightingale

Zoned K-8 O
William B. Ogden
Otis World Language Academy - It was established in 1880 as Armour Street School and became James Otis School in 1901. Mildred E. Chuchut served as principal from 1960 to 1962. At some point a petition circulated that stated that she caused damage to the morale there. It became James Otis World Language Academy in 2006.

Zoned K-8 P
Brian Piccolo (formerly Rezin Orr) School website
Ernst Prussing School website
Mary G Peterson Elementary School
Pritzker School

Zoned K-8 R
Irma C. Ruiz School website
Ravenswood School website

Zoned K-8 S
Mark Sheridan Math & Science Academy School website
Mark Skinner Elementary School School website
Washington D. Smyser Elementary School School website
Sidney Sawyer Elementary School School website
Sayre Language Academy School website
South Loop Elementary School School website
Harriet Beecher Stowe Dual Language School, formerly Stowe Elementary School, in West Humboldt, Chicago up to the early 1970s had an entirely white student body. In 1966 it had 1,212 students and 38 teachers. On August 10, 1966, Mildred Chucut became principal after being transferred from Jenner School. By the 1970s the student population included many Latinx. There were accusations of her disrespecting students, with some groups asking for her removal, much like how accusations were made against her when she was principal at Jenner. She denied the accusations and credited them to agitators trying to install a Latinx principal.
Elizabeth H. Sutherland Elementary School

Zoned K-7
Helge A. Haugan School website
Patrick Henry School website

Zoned K-6
John Barry School website
Charles S. Brownell School website
Laughlin Falconer School website
William G. Hibbard School website
William P. Nixon School website
John T. Pirie School website
Beulah Shoesmith School website
Woodlawn School website

Zoned K-5
Peter Cooper School website
Edward Everett School website
Nathanael Greene School website
Henry D. Lloyd School website
Cyrus H. McCormick School website
Mary McDowell School website
Socorro Sandoval School website
Franz Peter Schubert School website
Enrico Tonti School website

Zoned K-4
New Field School website
Louis Pasteur School website
Ferdinand Peck School website
James Shields School website

Zoned K-3
Jackie Robinson School website

Zoned K-2
Josefa Ortiz De Dominguez School website

Elementary/middle schools by type
Chicago Public Schools offers a wide variety of choices for elementary school students, including neighborhood, academic centers, charter, classical, contract, international gifted program, magnet, regional gifted center, small and special education.

Academic centers
Academic centers are housed in high schools and provide a college preparatory program for academically gifted and talented seventh and eighth grade students. There are seven academic centers:

 Brooks
 Kenwood
 Lane
 Lindblom
 Morgan Park
 Taft
 Young

Charter Schools
Acero Charter Schools
Brighton Park
Cisneros
Clemente
De La Cruz
De Las Casas
Fuentes
Idar
Marquez
Paz
Santiago
Tamayo
Torres
Zizumbo
ASPIRA Charter Schools
Haugen Middle School
Catalyst Elementary Charter School
Circle Rock
Maria
Christopher House Charter School
Chicago International Charter School
Avalon/South Shore
Basil
Lloyd Bond
Bucktown
Irving Park 
Loomis Primary
Prairie
Washington Park
West Belden 
Wrightwood
University of Chicago
Donoghue Elementary School
North Kenwood Oakland

Classical schools
The instructional program in classical schools is accelerated and highly structured for strong academic achievement in literature, mathematics, language arts, world language, and the humanities. There are seven classical schools:

 Decatur
 Edgar Allan Poe
 McDade
 Skinner North
 Skinner West
 Bronzeville
 Sor Juana

International gifted program
 Lincoln

Magnet schools
 Black 
 Burnside (formerly Ambrose)
 Clairemont (Zoned Magnet School)
 Davis
 Disney
 Disney II
 Drummond
 Ericson
 Franklin Fine Arts
 Frazier Prospective
 Galileo
 Gunsaulus
 Hawthorne Scholastic Academy
 Hearst
 Inter-American Magnet School
 Jackson, Andrew
 Kershaw
 LaSalle
 LaSalle II
 Murray
 Newberry
 Owen
 Prescott Magnet Cluster School
 Sabin
 Saucedo
 STEM Magnet Academy
 Stone Academy
 Suder
 Thorp
 Turner-Drew
 Vanderpoel
 Wildwood

Regional gifted centers
There are eleven regional gifted centers:

 Alexander Graham Bell School
 Beasley
 Beaubien
 Carnegie
 Coonley
 Edison
 Keller Regional Gifted Center
 Lenart Regional Gifted Center
 National Teachers Academy
 Pritzker School
 Pulaski International School
 South Loop

Special schools
 Daniel C. Beard Elenentary (K-3)
 Blair Early Childhood Center
 Moses Montefiore Academy (7-9)
 Wilma Rudolph Elementary Learning Center (K-5)

Defunct schools

Former high schools 

Academy of Communications and Technology Charter School - closed in 2010, the school building at 4319 W. Washington Blvd. was built in 1906 as St. Mel Catholic grade school
Richards Vocational High School - located at 5516 S. Maplewood Ave.  now houses Rachel Carson Elementary School since 1991. An annex was built in 1997
Calumet High School (1919–2006) - made way for the Perspectives Charter School, which currently occupies the building
 Carter Harrison Technical High School (1912–1983) - now houses the Maria Saucedo Scholastic Academy
Cecil Partee Academic Preparatory Center - occupied the old Hookway Elementary School
Chicago High School (1856–1880) - renamed Central High School in 1878, closed in 1880; building demolished in 1950 to make way for the Kennedy Expressway
Chicago Talent Development High School (2009–2014)
Chicago Virtual Charter School (K–12, 2006–2020)
 Collins High School - the building at 1313 South Sacramento Drive (inside Douglas Park) now houses both the Collins Academy High School and the North Lawndale College Prep High School
Cooley Vocational High School (1958–1979) - subject of the film Cooley High; the school, located on the 800 block of West Scott Street, closed in 1979 when it was replaced by a newer high school nearby and was eventually razed; the area around the former school was zoned to nearby Lincoln Park High School
 Cregier Vocational High School - closed at the end of the 1994-1995 school year
 DuSable High School 
 Englewood Technical Prep Academy (1873–2008) - closed due to poor performance; now houses TEAM Englewood Community Academy and Urban Prep Charter Academy
 English High and Manual Training School - renamed Crane High School in 1905
 Forrestville High School -  closed in 1971 when the nearby King College Prep High School was completed and students were sent there.
 Harper High School (1911–2021) – closed in 2021 due to low enrollment, performance, and others.
 Harvard High School (1865–1962) - closed in 1962 due to declining enrollment; last used by St. George's School before the building was converted into condominiums and a family home
 Hibbard High School - closed in 1927 when the nearby Roosevelt High School was completed and students were sent there; remains in operation as an elementary school
 Jefferson High School - closed in 1910 when the nearby Schurz High School was completed and students were sent there; the school was eventually razed and the Irish American Heritage Center was built on the site
 Kinzie High School - renamed Kennedy High School in 1965
 Lake High School - renamed Tilden Technical High School (now the Tilden Career Community Academy) in 1915
Las Casas Occupational High School (closed 2011)
 Lewis Institute High School - closed in 1917; merged with Armour Institute of Technology in 1940 to form the present-day Illinois Institute of Technology
 Loretto High School (Englewood) - closed in 1962 due to declining enrollment; the fate of the building is unknown
 Lucy Flower Vocational High School (1911–2003) - named after Lucy Flower; present site of Al Raby School for Community and Environment
 Manual High School - renamed University High School in 1904
 Medill High School - 1300 block of W. 14th place. First built in the 1890s, buildings on that site housed various grade levels. The high school closed in 1948.
 Metropolitan High School - closed during the 1990s; the building, located on 160 block of West Wendell, now houses the Ruben Salazar Bilingual Educational Center, a CPS K-8 school.
 Near North Career Metro High School - closed in 2001; the building is currently used as a training facility for the Chicago Police Department and Chicago Fire Department.
 North Park University High School - closed in 1969 due to declining enrollment and rising costs; now serves as an administration building for an adjacent college
 Parker High School - opened in 1901; closed in 1977 and reopened as Paul Robeson High School
 Pullman Technical High School - closed in 1950 due to budget constraints; continued to operate as a private school until 1997 when it was converted to the Brooks College Preparatory Academy
 Paul Robeson High School - closed in 2018 due to declining enrollment.
 South Division High School - closed in 1905 and reopened as Wendell Phillips Academy High School
 South Shore High School
 Spalding (1908–2004) - K through 12 school at 1628 W. Washington; building reopened as Hope Institute Learning Academy, a private school with a CPS contract emphasizing services for special-needs children
 Tuley/Northwest Division High School - closed in 1974 to make way for the new Roberto Clemente Community Academy
 Waller/North Division High School - renamed Lincoln Park High School in 1979
 Washburne Trade School - closed in 1993; reopened in 1994 as part of the City Colleges of Chicago before closing again in 1996. The culinary trade program continues as Washburne Culinary Institute of Kennedy-King College. Washburne school building at 3233 W. 31st St., built in 1910 as the Liquid Carbonic Co. factory and housing the school from 1958 until closing, was considered for landmark status as a Prairie School industrial building but suffered a fire in Feb. 2007 and was demolished by 2009. Converted to a vocational training school in 1919, Washburne was home to Chicago trade union apprentice programs; students earned a high school diploma at the same time.
 (West Division) McKinley High School - closed 1954, now the site of Chicago Bulls College Prep
 Westcott Vocational High School - renamed Simeon Career Academy in 1964
Westinghouse Career Academy High School  - closed in 2009 to make way for the new George Westinghouse College Prep (now selective enrollment) on the 3300 block of West Franklin Blvd.

Former middle schools 

 Canter Middle School - located at 4959 S Blackstone Ave; voted to be closed in 2013, allowed a 1-year reprieve so 8th graders could graduate. Reused by Chicago Public Schools as Kenwood Academic Center.

Former elementary schools 

R.S. Abbott Elementary School - located at 3630 S. Wells; opened in 1881 and closed in 2008; the building currently houses Air Force Academy High School
John D. Altgeld Elementary School - located at 1340 W 71st St.; closed in 2014. Renamed Daniel S. Wentworth Elementary School after moving to the site of this school.
Louis Armstrong Elementary School - located at 5345 W Congress Pkwy; voted to be closed in 2013. The Board of Education approved a sale to Rivers of Living Water Ministries International on April 26, 2017 for $250,000. Slated for use as community center.
Crispus Attucks Elementary School (formerly John Farron Elementary School) - located at 5055 S State St; voted to be closed in 2013, phased out in summer 2015. The Board of Education approved a sale to KMIS Developers on May 24, 2017 for $100,000.
 In 1967 parents demanded the removal of its principal, Mary Jane O'Shea. That year superintendent James F. Redmond transferred her, an action criticized by the Chicago Principals Club.
Katharine Lee Bates Elementary School - opened in 1960 and closed in 1979; in 1981 Tabernacle Christian Academy moved into that same building at 1203 W. 109th Place, and is currently in operation.
Blair Elementary School - located at 6751 W 63rd Pl; converted into Blair Early Childhood Center.
Arna W. Bontemps Elementary School - located at 1241 W 58th St.; voted to be closed in 2013. The Board of Education approved a sale to IFF on Jun 28, 2017 for $50,000. School slated to become mixed-use workforce housing development with at least 46 affordable units. Gym will be converted to commercial leased space. Outdoor area will become urban farm. Offer contingent on receipt of low-income housing tax credits from city.
Kate S. Buckingham School - located at 9207 S. Phillips Ave; voted to be closed in 2013. For sale.
Ralph J. Bunche Elementary School - located at 6515 S. Ashland Ave; closed in 2005, after graduating its final 8th graders and was renamed Providence Englewood Center.
Daniel H. Burnham School - located at 1903 E 96th St.; voted to be closed in 2013. For sale, main building and annex are being sold separately. 
Calhoun North Elementary School - located at 2833 W Adams St.; voted to be closed in 2013. The Board of Education approved a sale to Heartland Housing on May 24, 2017 for $200,000. Slated for use as affordable housing. Use restriction: Must be used as housing. Gym and auditorium must be preserved and made available for community programming and partnerships. Cannot be used as any kind of K-12 school or for commercial, retail or industrial development. Owner must provide and maintain a playground for neighborhood children. Sale price will also include about $360,000 in donation tax credits.
Zenos Colman Elementary School - located at 4655 S Dearborn St.; closed in 2005. Converted to the School district's Administration office
Cornell Elementary School - located at 7525 S. Maryland Ave, closed in 1975 and demolished in 1980.
Dodge Elementary School - Now served as Chicago Public Schools, Garfield Park Office.
Ana Roque De Duprey School - located at 2620 W Hirsch St.; voted to be closed in 2013. The Board of Education approved a sale to IFF Von Humboldt on Jul 22, 2015 for $3,100,000. Main building slated to become mixed-use community for teachers. Annex and adjoining playground to be sold to Puerto Rican Cultural Center for $1 and converted into a day care center.
Farragut Elementary School - Became a Junior High School and then a High School which is now known as Farragut Career Academy.
Froebel Elementary School - Demolished in 1980 for housing.
U.S. Grant Elementary School
Hardin Elementary School - closed in 1950's, homes built on that site.
Herman Felsenthal Elementary School - Demolished in 1983.
Henry Horner Elementary School - building converted into residential condos in 2013.
Amelia Dunne Hookway Elementary School - closed in 1981 due to underenrollment.  A transitional high school for ninth graders, Cecil Partee Academic Preparatory Center was later housed in that same building.  Partee was later relocated to Chicago Vocational Career Academy.  In 1988, Lenart Regional Gifted Center opened a selective admissions elementary school in that site.
Jefferson Elementary School
Jirka Elementary School - building converted to Pilsen Community Academy.
John V. LeMoyne Elementary School (formerly Theodore Herzi Elementary School) - Merged with Inter-American Magnet School.
Lafayette Elementary School - Located at 2714 W. Augusta Boulevard. Became Chicago High School for The Arts in 2015.
Langland Elementary School - Located at 2230 W. Cortland Street. This school was demolished in 1960 to make way for Ehrler Park.
Longfellow Elementary School - Razed in 1987 to make way for McKinley Branch Library.
Mayfair Elementary School - merged with Irish American Heritage Center in 1985.
Garrett A. Morgan Elementary School - located at 8407 S. Kerfoot. Closed in 2014.
Moseley Elementary School - Demolished in 2009.
Nathaniel Pope Elementary School - Closed in 2014 as part of the closure of 54 schools.
Florence B. Price Elementary School - Located at 4351 South Drexel Boulevard. Opened in 1964 and closed in 2013, houses a local church. 
Raymond Elementary School - reopened as Perspectives/IIT Math & Science Charter Academy.
Jacob Riis Elementary School - demolished in 2008.
Rosenwald Elementary School - Became Carroll-Rosenwald Specialty School after Carroll moved to this school. 
Betsy Ross Elementary School
Rowland Elementary School - Merged to North Lawndale College Prep Charter High School in 1998.
Thomas Scanlan Elementary School - (Later rename Songhai Learning Institute) Closed in 2014.
Shedd Elementary School - located at South Side, Chicago.
Jesse Spaulding Elementary School - closed in 2006, merged to Hope Learning Academy.
Spry Elementary School - building was converted into the Spry Community School.
Stewart Elementary School - closed in 2013 for lofts.
Stockton Elementary School - renamed Courtenay Language Arts Center in 2013 
Tennyson Elementary School 
Alexander von Humboldt Elementary School - located at 2622 West Hirsch Ave. At the beginning of the 2008-2009 school year, Ana Roque de Duprey School moved its operations to the Von Humboldt building. 
Willard Elementary School - closed in 1992. homes were built on that site.
Richard Wright Elementary School - opened in 1971 and closed in 2004 due to fire
Yale Elementary School - closed in 2013.

See also 
 Chicago Public Schools
 List of high schools in Illinois
 List of school districts in Illinois

References

External links 
 

Chicago-related lists

Chicago